Whiteout Conditions is the seventh studio album by Canadian indie rock band The New Pornographers. It was released on April 7, 2017, and is the first album not to feature either longtime drummer Kurt Dahle or singer-songwriter Dan Bejar.

The band released the first single "High Ticket Attractions" on January 27, 2017.

Release and reception 

Whiteout Conditions was released by Concord Music Group on April 7, 2017, to generally positive reviews. At Metacritic, which assigns a normalized rating out of 100 to reviews from mainstream publications, it received an average score of 78, based on 21 reviews. Dave Simpson, a critic for The Guardian, said its "songs about depression, society and the environment sound euphoric" within the music's "exuberant pile-up of harmonies, hooks and powerpop". Andy Gill from The Independent observed "a drive and urgency about Whiteout Conditions that whisks one along regardless, their usual indie-pop mode here strengthened by layers of fast, bubbly synths and pulsing Eurocentric beats". Writing for Vice, Robert Christgau said lead vocalist and songwriter Carl Newman "generates 11 soaring new pop songs, which in some abstrusely Krautrock way are sparer than the 13 on Brill Bruisers". Erik Adams of The A.V. Club was less impressed, writing that the record featured interesting musical and emotional ideas, but lacked memorable melodies and a sense of dynamics.

The album was a longlisted nominee for the 2017 Polaris Music Prize.

Track listing

Personnel
Carl Newman – vocals, guitar
Neko Case – vocals
John Collins – bass
Blaine Thurier – keyboards, synthesizer
Todd Fancey – lead guitar
Kathryn Calder – vocals, keyboards, guitar
Joe Seiders – drums, vocals

Charts

References

2017 albums
The New Pornographers albums
Dine Alone Records albums
Albums produced by A. C. Newman
Albums produced by John Collins (Canadian musician)